Leopard TOGT Pro Cycling is a Danish based team which acts as a development team for professional road racing cyclists. It was founded in 2012 and merged in 2023 with the Danish Riwal Cycling Team to form Leopard TOGT Pro Cycling. It was previously a team registered in Luxembourg but after the merge represented Denmark.

Team roster

Major wins
Sources:

2012
Dorpenomloop Rucphen, Giorgio Brambilla
Overall Triptyque des Monts et Châteaux, Bob Jungels
GP Commune de Sanem, Joël Zangerlé
Overall Flèche du Sud, Bob Jungels
Stage 3, Julian Kern
Stage 4, Bob Jungels
Paris–Roubaix U23, Bob Jungels
 National Time Trial Championships, Bob Jungels
 National U23 Time Trial Championships, Fábio Silvestre
 National Road Race Championships, Alexandre Pliuschin
 National U23 Road Race Championships, Alex Kirsch
Stage 4 Giro della Valle d'Aosta, Bob Jungels

2013
Stage 1 Tour de Normandie, Fábio Silvestre
Overall Triptyque des Monts et Châteaux, Fábio Silvestre
Stage 4 Circuit des Ardennes, Fábio Silvestre
GP Marc Angel, Pit Schlechter
U23 Provincial Road Championship Flemish Brabant, Sean De Bie
Stage 4 Tour de Azerbaijan, Jan Hirt
Stage 1 Flèche du Sud, Kristian Haugaard Jensen
Omloop der Kempen, Eugenio Alafaci
Games of the Small States of Europe Road Race, Joël Zangerlé
Festival Cycliste Schifflange, Tom Thill
Stage 4 Ronde de l'Oise, Fábio Silvestre
Stage 1 (TTT) Czech Cycling Tour
European Championship U23 Road Race, Sean De Bie
Team Designa Køkken Criterium, Kristian Haugaard Jensen
TT Preizendaul, Pit Schlechter
Stages 1 & 5 Tour of China, Daniel Klemme

2014
Ronde van Overijssel, Dennis Coenen

2017
 National U23 Time Trial Championships, Tom Wirtgen
Stage 2 International Tour of Rhodes, Szymon Rekita
Stage 3b Le Triptyque des Monts et Chateaux, Aksel Nōmmela

2018
Stage 1 Tour du Jura Cycliste, Szymon Rekita
Overall Carpathian Couriers Race, Filip Maciejuk
 National U23 Time Trial Championships, Pit Leyder

2019
Stage 3 Tour of Antalya, Szymon Rekita

References

External links

Cycling teams based in Luxembourg
Cycling teams established in 2012
UCI Continental Teams (Europe)